Ilex argentina, commonly known as Argentina holly, is a species of tree native to northwestern Argentina and Bolivia.

It is native to the Bolivian and Southern Andean Yungas, humid montane forests along the eastern slope of the Andes and Sierras Pampeanas mountain ranges. It is found between 900 and 1800 meters elevation in the Southern Andean Yungas, and up to 2300 meters elevation in the Bolivian Yungas.

References

argentina
Yungas
Trees of Argentina
Trees of Bolivia
Flora of the Southern Andean Yungas